Hellinsia tripunctatus is a moth of the family Pterophoridae. It is found in South Africa.

References

Endemic moths of South Africa
Moths described in 1881
Moths of Africa
tripunctatus
Insects of South Africa